Friedrich Ludwig Christian Volbehr (3 July 1819 – 6 August 1888) was a German historian and contributing editor.

Life 
Afterwards he studied theology at the University in Kiel. However, he did not take a theological Staatsexamen. From 1845 to 1853 he worked as a tutor on a noble estate in Holstein. During this time he was awarded a Dr. phil. degree in 1846 in Jena. From 1853 he directed a private institute in Elmshorn, but returned to Kiel as a private tutor. Besides, he was editor of the Kieler Correspondenzblatt and the Kieler Wochenblatt between 1859 and 1878. He rendered outstanding services to the local and regional history of Kiel and the surrounding area with a wide range of literature. On 6 August 1888 he died suddenly in Kiel at the age of 69 of a heart attack during a meeting of the Kunstverein as secretary.

Foundations / Memberships 
 Co-founder of the Kiel Institute for the Blind and member of the board until 1876
 Co-founder of the association for the care of those released from the institution for the blind
 Member and temporarily managing director of the Kieler Kunstverein
 From 1862 to 1876 member of the land committee for the construction of a new university building in Kiel
 Founder of the Society for Kiel City History and the associated Kiel City Library.

Awards 
 Holder of the Knight's Cross of the Order of the Crown (Prussia).

Work 
 Professoren und Dozenten der Christian-Albrechts-Universität zu Kiel 1665 bis 1933. Mühlau, 1934, 3rd revised edition by Richard Weyl
 Verzeichnis der gegenwärtig in Schleswig-Holstein angestellten und zur Anstellung berechtigten Geistlichen, welche nicht das Schleswig-Holsteinische Amtsexamen bestanden haben. Homann, 1869
 Die Schiller-Tage in Kiel. Kiel 1859
 Die Einweihungsfeier des neuen Universitäts-Gebäudes zu Kiel, 24. bis 26. Oktober 1876. Kiel 1876
 Beiträge zur Geschichte der Christian-Albrecht-Universität zu Kiel: Die drei Universitätsgebäude von 1665, 1768 und 1876. Die Frequenz der Universität von 1665 bis 1876. Kiel 1876
 Beiträge zur Topographie der Stadt Kiel in den letzten drei Jahrhunderten. 1st half (no more published): Schloß und Altstadt. Kiel 1881
 Kieler Predigergeschichte seit der Reformation. Kiel 1884
 Professoren und Docenten der Christian-Albrechts-Universität zu Kiel 1665 bis 1887. Kiel 1887

Literature

References

External links 
 Wikisource
 

19th-century German historians
19th-century German journalists
19th-century German male writers
1819 births
1888 deaths
Writers from Kiel